The Bayer designation Pi Columbae (π Col / π Columbae) may refer to either the star or star system in the constellation Columba:

Pi1 Columbae (star)
Pi2 Columbae (star system)

Columbae, Pi
Columba (constellation)